The Voice: la plus belle voix (season 6) is the sixth season of the French reality singing competition, created by media tycoon John de Mol.  It was aired from 18 February to 10 June 2017 on TF1.

One of the important premises of the show is the quality of the singing talent. Four coaches, themselves popular performing artists, train the talents in their group and occasionally perform with them. Talents are selected in blind auditions, where the coaches cannot see, but only hear the auditioner.

Three of the coaches continued from season 5, namely Florent Pagny, Zazie and Mika. But Matt Pokora replaced Garou.

Overview 

Color key

Blind auditions 

Color key

Blind auditions 1

Blind Auditions 2

Blind auditions 3

Blind auditions 4

Blind auditions 5

Blind auditions 6

Blind auditions 7

Battles 

Color key

Battles 1

Battles 2

Battles 3

Épreuves Ultimes (Knockout round) 

Color key

Épreuves Ultimes 1

Épreuves Ultimes 2

Lives

Lives 1: 20 May 2017

Lives 2: 27 May 2017

Semi-finals: 3 June 2017 

In the semi-finals and the finals, the two best candidates per team qualify in each team.

Votes are based on 150 points in total: Each coach would place his 50 points between his final 2 contestants. He should not distribute them equally but should give advantage to one of his /her two finalists. The votes of the public will be allocated based on votes for a total of 100 points. One contestant per team reaches the final.

Finals: 10 June 2017

References

france
2017 French television seasons